≤ may refer to:
 Inequality (mathematics), relation between values; a ≤ b means "a is less than or equal to b"
 Subgroup, a subset of a given group in group theory; H ≤ G is read as "H is a subgroup of G"